Marmalade Boy is a manga series written by Wataru Yoshizumi. The first chapter premiered in the May 1992 issue of Ribon where it was serialized monthly until its conclusion in the October 1995 issue. The series follows the rocky romance between step-siblings Miki Koishikawa and Yuu Matsuura, who meet after their parents swap partners.

The 39 unnamed chapters were collected and published in eight tankōbon volumes by Shueisha starting on December 12, 1992; the last volume was released on February 20, 1996. Shueisha later republished the series in six special edition volumes. The first special edition volume was released on March 15, 2004, and new volumes were published monthly until the final volume was released on August 11, 2004. The manga was adapted into a 76-episode anime series by Toei Animation that aired in Japan on Asahi TV and Fuji TV from March 13, 1994 to September 3, 1995. The manga series is licensed for regional language releases by Glénat in France, by Grupo Editorial Vid in Mexico, by Planeta DeAgostini in Spain, by Planet Manga in Italy, and by Egmont Publishing in Germany.

Marmalade Boy was licensed for an English language release in North America by Tokyopop. The individual chapters were serialized by the company's manga anthology, Smile, from December 2001 through April 2002. Tokyopop released the first collected volume of the series on April 23, 2002 and released new volumes monthly until the final volume was released on August 5, 2003. It was one of the first manga series that Tokyopop released in the original Japanese orientation, in which the book is read from right to left, and with the original sound effects left in place. Tokyopop's volumes of the series are out of print. Shueisha refused to renew the company's license of the series after becoming part-owner of rival publisher Viz Media. At Anime Expo 2022, Seven Seas Entertainment announced that they licensed the series for English publication in collector's edition format.

Volume list

Original edition

2008 edition

Collector's edition

See also

 List of Marmalade Boy characters

References

External links
Official Shueisha Marmalade Boy manga website (Archived) 

Marmalade Boy